The 1992–93 Florida State Seminoles men's basketball team represented Florida State University as members of the Atlantic Coast Conference during the 1992–93 NCAA Division I men's basketball season. Led by head coach Pat Kennedy, and future NBA players Sam Cassell, Doug Edwards, Bob Sura, and Charlie Ward, the Seminoles reached the Elite Eight of the NCAA tournament. The team finished the season 25–10, 12–4 in ACC play to finish in second place. They lost in the quarterfinals of the ACC Tournament to Clemson. They received an at-large bid to the NCAA tournament at the No. 3 seed in the South East region. They defeated Evansville and Tulane to advance to the Sweet Sixteen. In the Sweet Sixteen, they defeated Western Kentucky before losing to No. 2-ranked Kentucky in the Elite Eight.

Roster

Schedule and results

|-
!colspan=9 style=| Regular Season
|-

|-
!colspan=9 style=| ACC Tournament
|-

|-
!colspan=9 style=| NCAA Tournament
|-

Rankings

Awards and honors
Doug Edwards – AP Honorable Mention All-American
Bob Sura – AP Honorable Mention All-American

Team Players in the 1993 NBA draft

References

Florida State Seminoles men's basketball seasons
1992 in sports in Florida
1993 in sports in Florida
Florida State
Florida State